Lonjsko Polje (English: Lonja Field) is the largest protected wetland in both Croatia and the entire Danube basin.

The area of Lonjsko Polje is designated a nature park (park prirode), a kind of protected area in Croatia. The institution was established in 1998, and it is based in the village of Jasenovac.

According to the criteria of the Birds Directive of the European Union, the park is an important habitat for birds (Important Birds Area - IBA).

See also
 Protected areas of Croatia
 Tentative list of World Heritage Sites in Croatia

References

External links

 Lonjsko Polje website

Nature parks of Croatia
Ramsar sites in Croatia
Protected areas of Sisak-Moslavina County
Landforms of Sisak-Moslavina County